The Minor Associations cricket team, representing the Minor Associations in New Zealand, appeared once at first-class level, playing against the touring Australians at the Basin Reserve in March 1921. The Australians batted first and made 271, then the Minor Associations made 124 and 141, losing by an innings and 6 runs.

The Minor Associations team included players from the Manawatu, Nelson, North Taranaki, Poverty Bay, Rangitikei, Wairarapa and Wanganui associations. As Hawke's Bay and Southland were still competing at first-class level, their players were not considered. The team included only three men whose careers amounted to more than a handful of first-class games: Ces Dacre, David Collins and Bill Bernau. For six of the team it was their only first-class match.

Collins was the sole selector and the captain. He finished off the Australians' innings by taking four wickets for no runs in one eight-ball over: two bowled and two leg before wicket.

The Minor Associations team also played a non-first-class match against one of the Plunket Shield teams in most seasons in the 1920s and 1930s. When the Minor Associations gained collective first-class status with the advent of the Central Districts and Northern Districts teams in the 1950s, there was no further need for a Minor Associations team.

References

Former senior cricket clubs in New Zealand
Cricket teams in New Zealand